The second season of Without a Trace premiered September 25, 2003 on CBS and concluded May 20, 2004. There are 24 episodes in this season.

The second season was released on DVD in region 1 on March 13, 2007. In region 2 the first season was released on DVD in Germany on November 18, 2005 and in the UK on January 16, 2006. In region 4 the second season was released on  November 16, 2005.

Cast
 Anthony LaPaglia as John Michael Malone
 Poppy Montgomery as Samantha Spade
 Marianne Jean-Baptiste as Vivian Johnson
 Enrique Murciano as Danny Taylor
 Eric Close as Martin Fitzgerald

Episodes

References

Without a Trace seasons
2003 American television seasons
2004 American television seasons